Convergence research aims to solve complex problems employing transdisciplinarity. While academic disciplines are useful for identifying and conveying coherent bodies of knowledge, some problems require collaboration among disciplines, including both enhanced understanding of scientific phenomena as well as resolving social issues. The two defining characteristics of convergence research include: 1) the nature of the problem, and 2) the collaboration among disciplines.

Definition 
In 2016, convergence research was identified by the National Science Foundation as one of 10 Big Idea's for future investments. As defined by NSF, convergence research has two primary characteristics, namely:

 "Research driven by a specific and compelling problem. Convergence research is generally inspired by the need to address a specific challenge or opportunity, whether it arises from deep scientific questions or pressing societal needs.
 Deep integration across disciplines. As experts from different disciplines pursue common research challenges, their knowledge, theories, methods, data, research communities and languages become increasingly intermingled or integrated. New frameworks, paradigms or even disciplines can form sustained interactions across multiple communities."

Examples of convergence research

Biomedicine 
Advancing healthcare and promoting wellness to the point of providing personalized medicine will increase health and reduce costs for everyone. While recognizing the potential benefits of personalized medicine, critics cite the importance of maintaining investments in public health as highlighted by the approaches to combat the COVID-19 pandemic.

Cyber-physical systems 
The internet of things allows all people, machines, and infrastructure to be monitored, maintained, and operated in real-time, everywhere. Because the United States Government is one of the largest user of "things", cybersecurity is critical to any effective system.

STEMpathy 
Jobs that utilize skills in science, technology, engineering, and mathematics to provide care for human welfare through the use of empathy have been described as creating value with "hired hearts". Thomas Friedman coined the term "STEMpathy" to describe these jobs.

Sustainability 
Beyond recycling, the goal of achieving zero waste means designing a closed loop of the material and energy necessary to operate the built environment. Individuals and organizations, including corporations and governments, increasingly are committing to achieving zero waste.

References 

Biomedicine
Computer_systems
Sustainability